Eriodictyon traskiae is a species of flowering plant in the waterleaf family known by the common names Pacific yerba santa and Trask's yerba santa.

Description
Eriodictyon traskiae approaches a maximum height of two meters. Its twigs and foliage are covered in a dense coat of white woolly hairs, giving the bush a gray-green look. The leaves are oval and anywhere from 3 to 14 centimeters long and 1 to 7 wide. They are woolly and crinkled and the edges roll under, and they may have small teeth. The bush flowers in dense fuzzy bunches of white to brownish-purple glandular blossoms, each under a centimeter wide. The fruit is a tiny capsule up to three millimeters wide containing two to four minute seeds.

Distribution
This shrub is endemic to California, where it grows on the chaparral slopes of the central Coast Ranges and Southern California Transverse Ranges.

External links
Jepson Manual Treatment - Eriodictyon traskiae
Eriodictyon traskiae - Photo gallery

traskiae
Endemic flora of California
Natural history of the California chaparral and woodlands
Natural history of the California Coast Ranges
Natural history of the Transverse Ranges
Flora without expected TNC conservation status